Note: Except where otherwise stated, the date is that on which the individual was executed by shooting.

1936 

July

9 Aghasi Khanjian (murdered by Lavrentiy Beria)

August

22     Mikhail Tomsky (suicide)

25     Grigori Zinoviev, Lev Kamenev, Grigori Yevdokimov, Ivan Bakayev, Sergei Mrachkovsky, Ivan Smirnov, Vagarshak Ter-Vaganyan.

September

25     (Genrikh Yagoda dismissed from his post as head of the NKVD, and replaced by Nikolai Yezhov)

October

3 Platon Volkov

November

23 Boris Pinson

December

28     Nestor Lakoba (suspected poisoning)

1937 

January

10     Martemyan Ryutin, Ivar Smilga, Pyotr Zalutsky.

February

1      Georgy Pyatakov, Mikhail Boguslavsky, Yakov Drobnis, Nikolai Muralov, Leonid Serebryakov.

18     Sergo Ordzhonikidze (suicide)

March

8      Izrail Agol

13     Nikolai Glebov-Avilov

21     Levan Gogoberidze

22     Andrei Kolegayev

May

26     Vladimir Nevsky, Alexander Slepkov, Vladimir Smirnov

31     Yan Gamarnik (suicide), Nikolai Uglanov

June

12     Mikhail Tukhachevsky, Roberts Eidemanis, Boris Feldman, August Kork, Vitaly Primakov, Vitovt Putna, Ieronim Uborevich, Iona Yakir.

14     Voldemar Vöölmann

17     Max Levien

19     Yakov Doletsky (suicide), Dmitry Shmidt

20     Mark Gai, Andreu Nin (murdered in Barcelona), Jan Sten

27     Sandro Akhmeteli

July

1      Anatoliy Gekker, Matvei Vasilenko

2      Yevgeni Preobrazhensky, Lev Sosnovsky

3     Boris Gorbachev

7     Axel Bakunts

10     George Eliava

16     Vladimir Kirillov, Pavel Vasiliev

18     Grigol Giorgadze

19     Budu Mdivani

22     Paolo Iashvili (suicide)

August

4      Shalva Okudzhava

7      Oscar Ryvkin, Nikolai Sollogub

13     Aleksandr Voronsky, Boris Didkovsky

14     Leopold Averbakh, Karl Pauker, Ivan Zaporozhets Leonty Ugryumov

17     Sahak Ter-Gabrielyan

19     Ivan Kataev

21     Artur Artuzov, Adolf Warski, Leon Gaikis

25     Johannes Raudmets, Boris Steiger

27     Igor Akulov

30     Panas Lyubchenko (suicide)

September

2      Grigol Lordkipanidze (died while under interrogation), Alexander Shliapnikov

4      Ignace Reiss (murdered in Switzerland), Evgeny Pashukanis

10     Sergei Medvedev, Hayk Ovsepyan, David Petrovsky, Sergei Syrtsov, Sergei Tretyakov

14     Nikolay Ustryalov

20     Lev Karakhan, Marcian Germanovich, Nikolai Kashirin, Ivan Smolin, Ivan Teodorovich, Henryk Walecki

21     Seit Devdariani, Julian Lenski

28     Sergei Mezheninov, Timofei Sapronov

30     Mikheil Javakhishvili

October

3      Alexander Chayanov, Hans Kippenberger, Willy Leow

4     Vladimir Volsky

6      Alexey Skulachenko

10     Peter of Krutitsy

13     Bekir Çoban-zade, Ahmad Javad

14     Karl Bauman

15     Dmitry Fesenko, Evgen Gvaladze, Pamphylia Tanailidi

23     Nikolai Klyuev

26     Henryk Domski

27     Nikolai Durnovo

29     Yakau Branshteyn, Anani Dziakaŭ, Platon Halavach, Valery Marakou, Anatol Volny Vladimir Milyutin, Sergei Sedov

30     Ivan Akulov, Mikhail Chudov, Mendel Khatayevich, Aleksei Kiselyov, Alexander Krinitsky, Vladimir Polonsky, Mikhail Razumov, Alexander Shotman, Avel Yenukidze, Ivan Zhukov

November

1      Kuzebay Gerd, Milan Gorkic, Gustaw Henrykowski

4      Alexandru Dobrogeanu-Gherea

8      Mikhail Vasilyev-Yuzhin

10     Lev Shubnikov

11     Sergei Chavain, Olyk Ipai, Shabdar Osyp

15     Gleb Bokii

19     Mikhail Demichev

20     Metropolitan Joseph (Petrovykh)

21     Fyodor Golovin, Adrian Piotrovsky,

24     Nikolai Oleynikov

26     Yakov Hanecki, Heinz Neumann, Alexander Krasnoshchyokov, Leonid Kurchevsky, Emanuel Kviring

27     Yeghishe Charents, Aino Forsten, Eero Haapalainen, Ruben Rubenov, Daniil Sulimov

28     Rose Cohen

December

2      Petre Otskheli

3      Shalva Eliava, Boris Skibine

8      Pavel Florensky

10     Rashid Khan Kaplanov, Vladimir Lyubimov, Movses Silikyan

11     Jaan Anvelt (died from torture under interrogation), Hayk Bzhishkyan, Seraphim Chichagov, Mamia Orakhelashvili

16     Giorgi Mazniashvili, Titsian Tabidze

19     Waclaw Bogucki

20     Mustafa Mahmudov

22     Evgeni Mikeladze

23    Herman Hurmevaara

30    Alyaksandr Tsvikievich

31    James Lewin

1938 

January

2      Yevgeny Henkin, Ulvi Rajab

4     Boris Tageyev

6     Mikayil Mushfig

8     Jūlijs Daniševskis, Mikhail Plisetski

11    Erwin Bauer, Arvid Kubbel, Georgy Langemak

14    Anatoly Pepelyayev

15    Anna Tieke

17    Vladimir Beneshevich

20    Juho Perala, Nikolai Zhilyayev

25    Yevgeny Polivanov

29    Anton Prykhodko

February

8     Tikhon Khvesin, Nikolai Kuzmin, John Pepper

9     Vaino Kallio, Romuald Muklevich, Gazanfar Musabekov

10    Vladimir Antonov-Ovseenko, Christophor Araratov, Alexander Beloborodov, Maksim Haretski, Grigory Kaminsky, Joseph Meerzon, Alexander Serebrovsky, Aleksandr Smirnov

11    Asser Salo

13    Alexander Samoylovich

15    Leonid Ustrugov

17    Abram Slutsky (poisoned)

18    Georgii Frederiks, Dmitry Mushketov, Julian Shchutsky,

21    Vladimir Dzhunkovsky

25    Sanjar Asfendiyarov

26    Jukka Ahti, Abram Markson, Tyyne Salomaa

March

10    Tobias Akselrod

14    Vasily Glagolev

15    Nikolai Bukharin, Alexei Rykov, Genrikh Yagoda, Pavel Bulanov, Mikhail Chernov, Hryhoriy Hrynko, Akmal Ikramov, Vladimir Ivanov, Nikolai Krestinsky, Pyotr Kryuchkov, Arkady Rosengolts, Vasily Sharangovich, Isaac Zelensky, Prokopy Zubarev, Valentin Trifonov.

21    Mirza Davud Huseynov

22    Hermann Schubert

28    Vladimir Timiryov

April

5     Verner Lehtimäki

7     Artyom Vesyoly

8     Panteleimon Romanov

21    Sultan Majid Afandiyev, Oskari Ikonen, Boris Pilnyak, Huseyn Rahmanov Kustaa Rovio, Suren Shadunts

23    Kasyan Chaykovsky (died under interrogation)

24    Aliheydar Garayev

25    Jekabs Peterss, Ivan Mezhlauk

29    Aleksandra Sokolovskaya

May

8     Frans Myyryläinen

29    Hans Hellmann, Solomon Levit

June

3      Sándor Barta

5      Yakov Sheko

14     Edvard Gylling

18     Avetis Sultan-Zade

19     Anastasia Bitsenko

20     Vladimir Gorev, Nikolai Janson

21     Nikolai Goloded

25     Vladimir Gorev

29     Vasily Shorin

July

10     Gaziz Almukhametov

18    Vahan Totovents

27     Mikhail Velikanov

28     Yakov Davydov, Terenty Deribas, Vladimir Kirshon, Yakov Alksnis, Izrail Leplevsky Vladimir Orlov, Mikhail Sangursky, Alexander Svechin, Ioakhim Vatsetis

29     Janis Rudzutaks, Maksim Ammosov Nikolai Antipov, Moisei Frumkin, Vilhelm Knorin, Nikolai Krylenko, Valery Mezhlauk, Vasily Schmidt, Boris Shumyatsky, Matvey Skobelev, Jozef Unszlicht, Amatuni Vartapetyan Yakov Yakovlev, Volodymyr Zatonsky

Ivan Belov, Yan Berzin, Anton Bulin, Ivan Dubovoy, Pavel Dybenko, Sergei Gribov, Ivan Gryaznov, Innokenty Khalepsky, Vasiliy Khripin, Grigory Kireyev, Yepifan Kovtyukh, Mikhail Levandovsky, Alexander Sedyakin, Ivan Tkachev

August

1     Yakov Agranov, Alexander Bekzadyan, Eduard Berzin, Andrei Bubnov, Aleksei Stetsky, Semyon Uritsky, Yan Gaylit, Ivan Kosogov, Nikolay Kuibyshev, Mikhail Viktorov, Konstantin Yurenev

16    Marcel Pauker

19    Nikolai Krivoruchko, Vasiliy Mantsev, Nikolay Pakhomov

22    Pyotr Feldman, Vladimir Gittis, Vilhelm Garf, Lavrenti Kartvelashvili, Pavel Sytin

25    Semyon Dimanstein

26    Andrei Sazontov, Sofia Sokolovskaya, Mikhail Svechnikov

29    Jan Antonovich Berzin, Pyotr Bryanskikh, Boris Kamkov, Bela Kun, Jamshid Nakhchivanski, Lev Mironov, Leonid Zakovsky

September

1     Nikolai Bryukhanov, Mieczysław Broński, Valerian Osinsky

3     Alexander Tarasov-Rodionov

7     Nikolai Gorbunov, Karim Mammadbeyov, Nikolai Zimin

8     Mikhail Amelin, Ivan Nikulin

12    Gerzel Baazov

16    Vasily Yakovlev

17    Bruno Jasienski, Nikolai Kondratiev

20    Boris Kornilov, Theodore Maly

21    Benedikt Livshits

22    Vladimir Karelin

27    Hanna Karhinen

October

1     Viktor Bulla

3     Vladimir Varankin

4     Nikolai Vladimirovich Nekrasov

10    Vasili Oshchepkov

11    Grigory Gurkin

12    Matti Airola (died in prison), Maximilian Kravkov

26    Alexander Nikonov

27    Khadija Gayibova, Artemic Khalatov

29    Alexander Krinitsky

30    Osip Piatnitsky

November

6     Vladimir Ivanov

9     Vasily Blyukher  (beaten to death by the NKVD interrogator, Lev Shvartzman)

15     Karim Tinchurin

16     Abbas Mirza Sharifzadeh

19     Pavel Voyloshnikov

22    (Nikolai Yezhov dismissed as head of the NKVD, and replaced by Lavrentiy Beria)

29    Branislaw Tarashkyevich

December

9      Vasily Helmersen

27     Osip Mandelstam (died in a labour camp), Boris Gorev

30     Georgy Lomov

31     Artem Jijikhia

1939 

January

15     Kullervo Manner (died in a labour camp)

February

8      Mikhail Batorsky

10     Bela Szekely

20     Boris Kornilov

22     Boris Berman, Grigory Khakhanyan

23     Alexander Kosarev, Alexander Yegorov

25     Boris Pozern, Pyotr Smorodin

26     Vlas Chubar, Stanislaw Kosior, Levon Mirzoyan, Pavel Postyshev

March

3     Lazar Kogan, Nikolay Rattel

4     Rudolf Samoylovich

7     Alexey Bakulin, Matvei Berman, Volf Bronner, Hermann Remmele

10    Georgy Bondar, Ehsanollah Khan Dustdar

15    Leo Flieg

29    Boris Tolpygo

31    Vladimir Bogushevsky

April

6     Nikolai Bekryashev (died in a labour camp)

15    Aleksei Gastev, Dmitry Shakhovskoy

16     Efrem Eshba

19    Vladimir Copic

May

8     Nikolai Varfolomeyev

19    Karl Radek (murdered in a labour camp)

21    Grigori Sokolnikov (murdered in a labour camp)

June

6     Prince Dmitri.Mirsky (died in a labour camp)

July

9     Maria Koszutska (died in prison)

August

16   Martha Ruben-Wolf (suicide)

October

31    Platon Oyunsky (died in prison)

1940 

January

26    Zinovy Ushakov

27    Isaac Babel

28    Mirsaid Sultan-Galiev, Aleksandr Uspensky

February

2     Robert Eikhe, Mikhail Koltsov, Vsevolod Meyerhold, Mikhail Trilisser, Yefim Yevdokimov

3     Mikhail Frinovsky, Nikolai Yezhov

May

7    Nikolai Vissarionovich Nekrasov

June

23   Toivo Alavirta (died in a labour camp)

August

20    Leon Trotsky (assassinated in Mexico)

October
16    Boris Stomonyakov

See also
 Timeline of the Great Purge

Notes 

Great Purge
1930s in the Soviet Union
NKVD
Joseph Stalin